The 2018 OFC U-16 Championship was the 18th edition of the OFC U-16/U-17 Championship, the biennial international youth football championship organised by the Oceania Football Confederation (OFC) for the men's under-16/under-17 national teams of Oceania. The qualifying stage was held in Tonga between 14 and 20 July 2018, and the final tournament was held in the Solomon Islands between 9–22 September 2018.

Before the last tournament the age limit was reduced by a year to 16 years of age. However the last tournament remained the name U-17 Championship. For this tournament, the name has changed to U-16 Championship. So players who want to participate in the tournament needed to be born on or after 1 January 2002. At an OFC Executive Committee meeting held at its Auckland headquarters in November 2013 the competition format was modified. The competition was brought forward a year and the age limit was lowered to 16 years of age. The changes were made in order to allow the winner of the competition plenty of time for preparation and player development for upcoming World Cups at Under 17 level.

In March 2015, FIFA decided that the OFC gets two slots at every FIFA U-20 and U-17 World Cup. So the top two teams of the tournament qualified for the 2019 FIFA U-17 World Cup in Brazil as the OFC representatives. New Zealand, the defending champions, won the title for the eighth time, and qualified together with runners-up Solomon Islands.

Format
The tournament structure is as follows:
Qualifying stage: The four teams from the "developing associations" (American Samoa, Cook Islands, Samoa and Tonga) play in the qualifying stage. The winner of the round-robin tournament qualify for the final tournament.
Final tournament: A total of eight teams (Fiji, New Caledonia, New Zealand, Papua New Guinea, Solomon Islands, Tahiti, Vanuatu, and the qualifying stage winner) play in the final tournament. For the group stage, they are divided into two groups of four teams. The top two teams of each group advance to the knockout stage (semi-finals and final) to decide the winner of the OFC U-16 Championship and the two teams that qualify for the FIFA U-17 World Cup.

The draw for the tournament was held on 2 February 2018 at the OFC Headquarters in Auckland, New Zealand. In both the qualifying stage and the final tournament, the hosts (Tonga and Solomon Islands) were assigned to position A1 in the draw, while the remaining teams were drawn into the other positions without any seeding.

Teams
All 11 FIFA-affiliated national teams from the OFC entered the tournament.

Note: All appearance statistics include those in the qualifying stage (since 2017).

Venues
The hosts of the qualifying stage and final tournament were announced by OFC on 31 October 2017.
The qualifying stage was played at the Loto-Tonga Soka Centre in Nukuʻalofa, Tonga.
The final tournament was played at the Lawson Tama Stadium in Honiara, Solomon Islands.

Squads

Players born on or after 1 January 2002 are eligible to compete in the tournament. Each team can name a maximum of 20 players.

Qualifying stage
The winner advance to the final tournament (group stage).

All times are local, TOT (UTC+13).

Group stage
The top two teams of each group advance to the semi-finals.

All times are local, SBT (UTC+11).

Group A

Group B

Knockout stage

Bracket

Semi-finals
Winners qualify for 2019 FIFA U-17 World Cup.

Third place match

Final

Winners

Goalscorers
In the qualifying stage, 
In the final tournament, 
In total,

Awards
The Golden Ball Award is awarded to the most outstanding player of the tournament. The Golden Glove Award is awarded to the best goalkeeper of the tournament. The Golden Boot Award is awarded to the top scorer of the tournament. The Fair Play Award is awarded to the team with the best disciplinary record at the tournament.

Qualified teams for FIFA U-17 World Cup
The following two teams from OFC qualify for the 2019 FIFA U-17 World Cup.

1 Bold indicates champions for that year. Italic indicates hosts for that year.

Age fraud controversy
The Solomon Islands, which originally finished second, were found by the OFC to have deliberately fielded overage player Chris Satu during the tournament and would forfeit all results and their place in the 2019 FIFA U-17 World Cup. The decision was reviewed under appeal from the Solomon Islands Football Federation. The OFC Executive Committee announced on 3 May 2019 that Solomon Islands would keep their spot for the FIFA U-17 World Cup on the grounds that the federation had not knowingly broken the rules as Satu had a government issued passport showing his eligibility.

On 11 December 2019, it was found that Solomon Islands' player Maxwell Keana played in five games with a "false birth certificate and passport to improperly seek eligibility" for the competition. As a result, the Solomon Islands Football Federation was sanctioned and the Oceania Football Confederation banned the Solomon Islands from entering a team in the 2023 OFC U-17 Championship.

Notes

References

External links
2018 OFC U-16 Championship, oceaniafootball.com
News > 2018 OFC U-16 Championship, oceaniafootball.com

2018
2017–18 in OFC football
2018–19 in OFC football
2018 in Tongan sport
2018 in Solomon Islands sport
2018 OFC U-16 Championship
2018 OFC U-16 Championship
July 2018 sports events in Oceania
September 2018 sports events in Oceania
2018 in youth association football
2019 FIFA U-17 World Cup qualification